This page lists major rebellions and revolutions that have taken place during Bosnian history.

Ottoman Empire (1463–1878)

Serb Uprising (1596–1597)
Jančić's rebellion (1809)
Bosnian uprising (1831–32)
Priest Jovica's Rebellion (1834)
Second Mašići Rebellion (1834)
Posavina rebellion (1836)
Herzegovina uprising (1852–1862)
Montenegrin–Ottoman War (1852–53)
Pecija's First Revolt (1858)
Herzegovina uprising (1875–1877)

Austro-Hungarian Empire (1878–1918)

Bosnian Uprising (1878)
Herzegovina Uprising (1882)

Kingdom of Yugoslavia (1918–41)

Husino rebellion (1920)

World War II (1941–45)

May 1941 Sanski Most revolt (1941)
June 1941 uprising in eastern Herzegovina (1941)
Drvar uprising (1941)
Srb uprising (1941)

SFR Yugoslavia (1945–92)

Cazin rebellion (1950)
Unrest in SR Bosnia and Herzegovina (1992)

Post-independence (1995–present)

JMBG protests (2013)
Unrest in Bosnia and Herzegovina (2014)

See also
Bosnian War

Notes

 
Bosniak history
Peasant revolts
 
Political controversies in Bosnia and Herzegovina